Suzi Carlson is an American politician currently serving in the Kansas House of Representatives, representing the 64th district. She was elected in 2018, succeeding Republican Susie Swanson, who did not seek reelection.

A former cosmetologist, Carlson served for 21 years as the city judge in Clay Center, Kansas. During that time she also served as a city judge for Wakefield, Kansas, Green, Kansas, Longford, Kansas and Miltonvale, Kansas.

Kansas House of Representatives Committees 2019-2020
Financial Institutions and Pensions
Children and Seniors
Social Services Budget

References

Living people
Republican Party members of the Kansas House of Representatives
21st-century American politicians
21st-century American women politicians
Women state legislators in Kansas
People from Clay Center, Kansas
American women judges
Year of birth missing (living people)